Peter Michael Hamel (born 15 July 1947 in Munich) is a German composer.  His works have been associated with the minimalist style of composition, and in the late 1970s with the New Simplicity movement.

He is the son of the film director Peter Hamel. Hamel studied musical composition, psychology and sociology in Munich and Berlin with teachers including Günter Bialas and Carl Dahlhaus. He then continued his education abroad, spending several extensive periods in Asia.

In 1970, he founded "Between", an international group dedicated to improvisational music with whom he made 6 records on the intuition/WERGO label and in 1978 in Munich, he founded the Freies Musikzentrum, an institute for musical education and therapy. In 1978, his book Through Music to the Self was published in English translation, obtaining wide circulation in Europe and the U.S.

Between 1997 and 2012, he was professor for composition at the Hochschule für Musik und Theater in Hamburg. His orchestral and chamber music is published by Schott, Bärenreiter and E.R.P./Celestial Harmonies. He composed four operas, many orchestral works (e.g., Gestalt), violin and piano concertos, sacred works for soprano, choirs and orchestra (e.g., Missa); Shoah (a radio-composition about the Holocaust), chamber-music compositions (including four string quartets). He is in demand as a performing artist (piano, prepared piano, pipe organ, voice and live-electronics). His First Symphony was premiered by Sergiu Celibidache in 1988; his Second Symphony had its first performance in Munich on April 29, 2008 with the Munich Philharmonic. In 2007 Hamel's Of the Sound of Life for pianist Roger Woodward was published by Celestial Harmonies.

American minimalist composer Terry Riley has said:

Discography
 Aura (1972)
 Hamel (1972)
 The Voice of Silence (1972)
 Buddhist Meditation East-West (1975)
 Nada (1977)
 Colours of Time (1980)
 Bardo (1981)
 Transition (1983)
 Organum (1986)
 Let It Play: Selected Pieces 1979-1983 (1987)
 Arrow of Time / The Cycle of Time (1991)
 Violinkonzert Diaphainon Gralbilder (1993)
 De Visione Dei (2001)
 Hamel: String Quartet No. 3, String Quartet No. 4, String Trio (2007)

See also 
List of ambient music artists

References

Footnotes

External links 
  

German classical composers
Musicians from Munich
1947 births
Living people
20th-century classical composers
21st-century classical composers
German male classical composers
20th-century German composers
21st-century German composers
20th-century German male musicians
21st-century German male musicians